The history of Haifa dates back before the 3rd century BCE. Since then it has been controlled by several civilizations, including the Canaanites, Israelites, Romans, Byzantines, Arabs, Crusaders, Kurds, the Mamluks, the Ottoman Turks and the British; currently it is a major city in Israel.It is a mixed city of Jews and Arab citizens of Israel.

Early history

A small port city, Tell Abu Hawam, existed in the Haifa region in the Late Bronze Age (14th century BCE). The 6th-century BCE geographer Scylax describes a city "between the bay and the Promontory of Zeus" (i.e., Mount Carmel) which may be a reference to a settlement on the site of modern-day Haifa in the Persian period. The city moved to a new site south of what is now Bat Galim, in the Hellenistic period, after the old port became blocked with silt. The archaeological site of Shikmona lies southwest of Bat Galim neighbourhood of Haifa. Mount Carmel and the Kishon River are also mentioned in the Bible. The geology of Mount Carmel has left the Mount riddled with caves. A grotto on the top of Mount Carmel is known as the "Cave of Elijah", traditionally linked to the Prophet Elijah and his apprentice, Elisha. In Arabic, the highest peak of the Carmel range is named El-Muhrrakah, or the "place of burning," harking back to the burnt offerings and sacrifices on this hilltop in Canaanite and early Israelite times It is believed that this was the point of Elijah's biblical confrontation with hundreds of priests of a Baal; the Baal in question was probably Melqart.

There are disputes over the exact location of early Haifa with many researchers believing that the name ‘Haifa’ is identical to a settlement of which the remains have been found in an area that extends from the present-day Rambam Hospital to the Jewish Cemetery in Yafo Street. The residents of this time were largely thought to have been involved in various coastal industries, including fishing and agriculture as well as acting as a port welcoming groups of people who eventually settled in the city. Before the Persians came to the area in 600 CE, the population of Haifa is thought to have been widely dispersed across the area.

The city is first mentioned in Talmudic literature around the 3rd century CE, as a small fishing village and the home of Rabbi Avdimos and other Jewish scholars. The hellenised population lived along the coast at this time was engaged in commerce. Haifa was located near the town of Shikmona, the main Jewish town in the area at that time and a center for making the traditional Tekhelet dye used for Jewish Priests' temple cloth

Under Byzantine rule, Haifa continued to flourish, although never grew to great importance due to its proximity to Acre.

Medieval era
Byzantine rule ended in the 7th century, when the city was conquered by the Persians, and then by the Arabs in the 640s. During early Arab rule, Haifa was largely overlooked in favor of the port city of 'Akka. Under the Rashidun Caliphate, the city began to develop and in the 9th century under the Abbasid Caliphate, Haifa established trade relations with Egyptian ports and the city contained several shipyards. The inhabitants engaged in trade and maritime commerce. Glass production and dye-making from marine snails were the city's most lucrative industries. Nasir-i-Khusrau visited in 1047; he noted that "Haifa lies on the seashore, and there are here palm-gardens and trees in numbers. There are in this town shipbuilders, who build very large craft."

In 1100, it was conquered again by the crusaders, after a fierce battle with its Jewish inhabitants and Saracen garrison. Under crusader rule, the city was a part of the Principality of Galilee until the Muslim Mameluks captured it in 1265.

The Carmelites were founded at, and named after, Mount Carmel, in the 12th century. Since that time, at the peak of the Mount near Haifa, there has historically been a building that has variously been a mosque, monastery, and hospital; in the 19th century it was reconstructed as a Carmelite monastery, and a cave located there, which functions as the monastery's crypt, was treated as having once been Elijah's cave.

Ottoman era
In 1761 Zahir al-Umar, Arab ruler of Acre and Galilee, destroyed the old city of Haifa Called "Haifa El-Atika" and rebuilt the town in a new location, surrounding it with a wall. This event is marked as the beginning of the town's modern era. After Zahir's death in 1775, the town remained under Ottoman rule until 1918, except for two brief periods: in 1799, Napoleon Bonaparte conquered Haifa as part of his unsuccessful campaign to conquer Palestine and Syria, but withdrew in the same year; and between 1831 and 1840, the Egyptian viceroy Mehemet Ali governed, after his son Ibrahim Pasha wrested control from the Ottomans.

In the years following the Egyptian occupation, Haifa grew in population and importance while Acre suffered a decline. The arrival of the German Templers in 1868, who settled in what is now known as the German Colony of Haifa, was a turning point in Haifa's development. The Templers built and operated a steam-based power station, opened factories and inaugurated carriage service to Acre, Nazareth and Tiberias, playing a key role in modernizing the city.

It was in the late 19th century that the area rose to importance in the Baháʼí Faith as the remains of the Báb were moved initially to Acre and, in 1909, to Haifa where a special tomb was erected for this purpose on Mount Carmel by `Abdu'l-Bahá. Haifa remains an important site of worship, pilgrimage and administration for the members of the religion. The Baháʼí World Centre (comprising the Shrine of the Báb, terraced gardens and administrative buildings) are all on Mount Carmel's northern slope. The location of the Baháʼí holy places in Haifa has its roots in the exile of the religion's founder, Bahá'u'lláh, to the Haifa/'Akka area during Ottoman rule over Palestine. The Baháʼí holy places are also the most visited tourist attraction in Haifa.

In the early 20th century, early Ahmadi Muslims migrated to Kababir, a small suburb of Haifa, today consisting of Jews and Ahmadis. Over years the community developed and now acts as the Arab centre of the community. The community broadcasts its programmes to the Arab world via the MTA 3 channel from Haifa. Kababir is also known for its Mahmood mosque, a unique architectural landmark.

20th century

At the beginning of the 20th century, Haifa emerged as an industrial port city and growing population center. The Hejaz railway and the Technion were established at that time. The Haifa District was home to approximately 20,000 inhabitants, 96 percent Arab (82 percent Muslim and 14 percent Christian), and four percent Jewish. As aliyah increased, the balance shifted. By 1945 the population was  53 percent Arab (33 percent Muslim and 20 percent Christian) and 47 percent Jewish. The 1922 census recorded a population of 25,000 in Haifa, of whom more than 9,000 were Muslims, slightly fewer Christian Arabs, and more than 6,000 Jews. According to the 1931 census, it contained 50,403 residents, including about 20,000 Muslims, 15,923 Jews, and about 14,000 Christians. In 1947, the population comprised 70,910 Arabs (41,000 Muslims and 29,910 Christians) and 74,230 Jews. The Christians belong mostly to the Greek Orthodox Church (Arab Orthodox). Haifa was designated as part of the Jewish state in the 1947 UN Partition Plan that proposed dividing Mandate Palestine into two states.
In December 1947 the Jewish militant group Irgun hurled two bombs at a group of Arabs waiting for construction jobs outside the  Consolidated Refineries in Haifa, killing 6 and injuring 42. Rioting erupted in which 2,000 Arab employees killed 39 of their Jewish colleagues in what has become known as the Haifa Oil Refinery massacre. Jewish forces retaliated by raiding the Arab village of Balad al-Shaykh on December 31, 1947. Control of Haifa was a critical objective in the 1948 Arab-Israeli War, as it was the country's major industrial port.

The British in Haifa redeployed on April 21, 1948, withdrawing from most of the city while still maintaining control over the port facilities. The city was captured on April 23, 1948 by the Carmeli Brigade of the Haganah who were ordered into action by Mordechai Maklef at 10:30 am on 21 April following three months of unsuccessful attacks by Arab forces. Most of the Muslim population fled through the British-controlled port.  However, as many as 2,000 Christians and 1,300 Muslims were still living in the  city by June 1948. By the end of June the remaining British forces left Haifa.

Today, Haifa has a population of about 266,300 people. Approximately 90% of the population consists of Israeli-Jews, predominantly those without religious classification and mostly immigrants from the former Soviet Union from mixed-marriage families of Jewish origin. According to the Israeli Central Bureau of Statistics, Israeli-Arabs constitute 9% of Haifa's population, the majority living in Wadi Nisnas, Abbas and Halisa neighborhoods.

Archaeology 
In 2020, archaeologists from the Leon Recanati Institute for Maritime Studies at Haifa University uncovered the 25-meter-long ship dating back to the seventh-century. The ship was built using the "shell-first" method, containing the largest collection of Byzantine and early Islamic ceramics discovered in Israel. Many inscriptions in both Greek and Arabic letters, the name of Allah and numerous Christian crosses were unearthed, including 103 amphoras with 6 types of which 2 types had never been discovered previously.

See also
 Timeline of Haifa
Economy of Israel
Tourism in Israel

References

Further reading

 
 

 
Haifa
Haifa